Emil Bemström (born 1 June 1999) is a Swedish professional ice hockey centre currently playing for the Columbus Blue Jackets in the National Hockey League (NHL). He was selected in the fourth round, 117th overall, in the 2017 NHL Entry Draft by the Blue Jackets.

Playing career
Bemström played as a youth within the Leksands IF organization. He made his professional debut in the 2016–17 season, appearing scoreless in 5 Swedish Hockey League games.

Following relegation to the HockeyAllsvenskan for the 2017–18 season, Bemström notched 8 goals and 15 points in 33 games for Leksand, before leaving the club in the off-season and returning to the SHL by agreeing to a two-year contract with Djurgårdens IF on 2 May 2018.

In the 2018–19 season, Bemström scored his first SHL goal in the first game of the season against Frölunda HC on 15 September 2018. In a breakout season with Djurgården, he led the league in goals and power play goals and captured Rookie of the Year honours and also won the scoring title for the 18–19 regular season with 23 goals. At the conclusion of the 2018–19 season, Bemström was also named junior player of the year by the Swedish ice hockey journalist association.

On 15 May 2019, Bemström was signed by the Columbus Blue Jackets to a three-year, entry-level contract. Bemström finished his rookie season scoring 20 points in 56 games.

With the following 2020–21 NHL season delayed due to the COVID-19 pandemic, Bemström opted to continue playing in Europe after accepting a loan assignment from the Blue Jackets to play with Finnish club, HIFK of the Liiga, on 8 September 2020. In 16 games with HIFK, Bemström displayed his offensive acumen in compiling 8 goals and 17 points before returning to the Blue Jackets organization for training camp.

Personal life
Emil's father, Jörgen Bemström, played 517 SHL (then Elitserien) games.

Career statistics

Regular season and playoffs

International

Awards and honours

References

External links
 

1999 births
Cleveland Monsters players
Columbus Blue Jackets draft picks
Columbus Blue Jackets players
Djurgårdens IF Hockey players
HIFK (ice hockey) players
Leksands IF players
Living people
Swedish ice hockey centres
People from Nyköping Municipality
Sportspeople from Södermanland County